Elizabeth FitzAlan may refer to:

Elizabeth FitzAlan, Duchess of Norfolk (1366–1425), English noblewoman and the wife of Thomas Mowbray, 1st Duke of Norfolk;
Elizabeth de Bohun, also Elizabeth FitzAlan (d. 1385), Countess of Arundel and the wife of Richard FitzAlan, 9th Earl of Arundel; or
Elizabeth le Despencer, Lady Maltravers, also Elizabeth FitzAlan (d. April 1408), English noblewoman and the wife of John FitzAlan, 2nd Baron Arundel, 2nd Baron Maltravers (1364–1390).